The Zaozhuang–Linyi railway is a railway line in Shandong, China.

History 
Work on the line began in early 2009. It opened on 29 November 2012.

Specification 
It is single-track and electrified. The western terminus of the line is Zaozhuang West railway station on the Beijing–Shanghai railway. The eastern terminus is Zhubao railway station, a freight terminus on the Yanzhou–Shijiusuo railway.

References 

Railway lines in China
Railway lines opened in 2012